Red Cross is a town in Stanly County, North Carolina, United States. The population was 742 as of the 2010 Census.

Geography

History
With growth resulting from the expansion of suburban communities around Charlotte, Red Cross incorporated on August 1, 2002. The people wanted to keep their area agricultural and rural to the extent that it was possible.

Demographics

2020 census

As of the 2020 United States census, there were 762 people, 323 households, and 177 families residing in the town.

References

External links
 Official website

Towns in Stanly County, North Carolina
Towns in North Carolina
Populated places established in 2002
2002 establishments in North Carolina